The 3000 and 5000 meters distances for women in the 2015–16 ISU Speed Skating World Cup was contested as one cup over six races on six occasions, out of a total of World Cup occasions for the season, with the first occasion taking place in Calgary, Alberta, Canada, on 13–15 November 2015, and the final occasion taking place in Heerenveen, Netherlands, on 11–13 March 2016.

Martina Sáblíková of the Czech Republic became the champion, winning 5 of 6 races. She did not take part in the final race in Heerenveen.

Top three

Race medallists

Standings 

Standings as of 31 January 2016.

References 

 
Women 3000